This is a list of episodes of the South Korean television series Stranger.

Series overview

Episodes

Season 1 (2017)

Season 2 (2020)

Notes

References

External links
  (season 1) 
  (season 2) 

Lists of South Korean drama television series episodes